Buck James is an American medical drama television series created by Paul F. Edwards that aired on ABC from September 27, 1987 until May 5, 1988.

Premise
Buck James is a middle-aged surgeon at a hospital in Texas who also has a passion for ranching. James, a "hard-driving, daredevil, brilliant sort of fellow", is chief surgeon at Holloman University Hospital and head of one of its trauma units. In addition to his challenges at work, at home he has a son "who is going through all the usual painful gyrations of growing up" and a two-months-pregnant daughter who has separated from her husband and he had to deal with "a divorced wife who wouldn't let go."

The title character was based on real-life physician Red Duke. Star Dennis Weaver shadowed Duke at work (including being present during surgeries that Duke performed) to prepare for playing James, and Duke was a consultant on scripts for the show. Memorial Hermann Hospital in Houston, where Duke practiced, was the location for filming of the show's pilot.

Buck James was broadcast from 10 to 11 p.m. Eastern Time on Sundays on ABC from September 27, 1987, until January 10, 1988. and from 10 to 11 p.m. Eastern Time on Thursdays on ABC from March 10, 1988, until May 5, 1988. It was produced by Entertainment Partners in association with Tri Star Productions.

Cast
Dennis Weaver as Buck James
Alberta Watson as Rebecca Meyer
Shannon Wilcox as Jenny James
Jon Maynard Pennell as Clint James
Dehl Berti as Vittorio
John Cullum as Henry Carliner
Elena Stitiler as Dinah James
Perry Anzilotti as Myron

Episodes

References

External links

1987 American television series debuts
1988 American television series endings
1980s American drama television series
1980s American medical television series
English-language television shows
American Broadcasting Company original programming
Television series by Sony Pictures Television
Television shows set in Texas